Andrey Viktorovoich Zamkovoy (born 4 July 1987) is a Russian amateur boxer, best known for winning gold at the 2019 AIBA World Boxing Championships.

Career
At the 2009 World Amateur Boxing Championships, southpaw Zamkovoy upset two-time world champion Serik Sapiyev in the semifinal but was surprised himself in the final by German Jack Culcay-Keth (2009 results).

At the 2012 Summer Olympics (Results) he won his first three fights, beating Maimaitituersun Qiong, Adam Nolan and Errol Spence before losing his semifinal to Serik Säpïev, who went on to win the gold medal.

He also competed at the 2016 Olympic Games, but he lost his first fight.

Zamkovoy again qualified for the 2020 Olympics where he won his second bronze, now as a 34 year old.

References

External links

WorldChamps2009

1987 births
Living people
People from Svobodny, Amur Oblast
Welterweight boxers
Boxers at the 2012 Summer Olympics
Boxers at the 2016 Summer Olympics
Olympic boxers of Russia
Olympic bronze medalists for Russia
Olympic bronze medalists for the Russian Olympic Committee athletes
Olympic medalists in boxing
Medalists at the 2012 Summer Olympics
Medalists at the 2020 Summer Olympics
Russian male boxers
AIBA World Boxing Championships medalists
Universiade medalists in boxing
Universiade gold medalists for Russia
World welterweight boxing champions
Medalists at the 2013 Summer Universiade
Boxers at the 2020 Summer Olympics
Sportspeople from Amur Oblast